Anton Yevgenyevich Lazko (born August 25, 1971) is a Russian slalom canoer who competed in the early to mid-1990s. He finished 35th in the K-1 event at the 1996 Summer Olympics in Atlanta.

References
Sports-Reference.com profile

1971 births
Canoeists at the 1996 Summer Olympics
Living people
Olympic canoeists of Russia
Russian male canoeists
Place of birth missing (living people)
20th-century Russian people